Marc Rigouts is a Belgian equestrian. At the 2012 Summer Olympics he competed in the Individual eventing. He completed the Dressage and Cross-country rounds, but withdrew before the first round of Jumping, preventing him from advancing to the final 25.

References

Belgian male equestrians

Living people
Olympic equestrians of Belgium
Equestrians at the 2012 Summer Olympics
Year of birth missing (living people)